Sir Edward Albert Sassoon, 2nd Baronet (20 June 1856 – 24 May 1912) was a British businessman and politician.

Early life
A member of the Sassoon family, he was born on 20 June 1856 in Bombay, India. He was the son of Hannah Moise and Albert Abdullah David Sassoon (1818–1896). He graduated from the University of London. He served as a major in the Middlesex Yeomanry (Duke of Cambridge's Hussars).

Career
He was elected as the Liberal Unionist Party Member of Parliament (MP) for Hythe in March 1899. Active in Jewish community affairs, he served as a vice-president of Jews' College, London and the Anglo-Jewish Association.

He succeeded to the baronetcy in 1896 on the death of his father.

Wireless telegraphy bill 
On 13 July 1910, Sassoon proposed a bill in the House of Commons that would make installation of wireless telegraphy on passenger ships compulsory. Opposition to the bill was led by Thomas Gibson Bowles, who argued that the expense involved for shipping lines would make them less competitive and the bill failed. It would take the sinking of the Titanic two years later and the resulting 1914 International Convention for the Safety of Life at Sea to make Sassoon's proposal a reality.

Personal life
In 1887, he married Aline Caroline de Rothschild (1867–1909), daughter of Baron Gustave de Rothschild and Cécile Anspach from Paris. They had two children:
Philip Albert Gustave David (1888–1939).
Sybil Rachel Bettie Cécile, Marchioness of Cholmondeley (1894–1989).

He died in 1912 at the age of fifty-five. His body was placed in a mausoleum in an Indian style, behind his house at Eastern Terrace, Brighton. The Sassoon Mausoleum had been built in 1876 by his father as a family resting place. However, there were no more burials after 1933, when it was emptied and sold, becoming first a furniture store, then a decorator's, next a restaurant and finally the ballroom of the Hanbury Arms public house. In 2006, the building was again sold to be converted to a private members' club.

His great-great-grandson is actor Jack Huston.

References

External links
 
 Sir Edward Sassoon in the Jewish Encyclopedia

1856 births
1912 deaths
Alumni of the University of London
London School of Jewish Studies
Baronets in the Baronetage of the United Kingdom
British Jews
British people of Iraqi-Jewish descent
Liberal Unionist Party MPs for English constituencies
Edward
UK MPs 1895–1900
UK MPs 1900–1906
UK MPs 1906–1910
UK MPs 1910
UK MPs 1910–1918
Jewish British politicians
Burials at Liberal Jewish Cemetery, Willesden
British politicians of Iraqi descent
19th-century British businesspeople
British people of Indian-Jewish descent
British India emigrants to the United Kingdom
Baghdadi Jews
British politicians of Indian descent
British businesspeople of Indian descent